Nychum is a rural locality in the Shire of Mareeba, Queensland, Australia. In the  Nychum had a population of 0 people.

Geography 
The entire locality is within the pastoral property Nychum which has its homestead at the end of Nychum Road adjacent to Elizabeth Creek. It is owned by the Kenny Creek pastoral company and is managed from their property in neighbouring Bellevue.

Wollenden Airstrip (also known as Nychum) is an airstrip located to the immediate south-west of the Nychum homestead.

The land use is grazing on native vegetation.

History 
In the  Nychum had a population of 0 people.

Education 
There are no schools in Nychum. The nearest primary school is Chillagoe State School in neighbouring Chillagoe to the south. There are no nearby secondary schools. Distance education or boarding schools are the options.

References 

Shire of Mareeba
Localities in Queensland